The 1982 Denver Broncos season was the team's 23rd year in professional football and its 13th with the National Football League (NFL). The Broncos played only nine games this season, owing to the strike imposed by the National Football League Players Association (NFLPA). The Broncos were looking to improve on their 10-6 record from 1981. But due to many injuries plus the strike, the Broncos only won 2 games, while losing 7, their worst record since 1971 as well as their first losing season since 1975. This was also their first season with below 3 wins since 1964. Both of the Broncos wins came against interconference teams; the Broncos only won 1 home game the entire year, against reigning Super Bowl champion San Francisco, and their only other win was against the Los Angeles Rams. The Broncos went winless against AFC foes in 1982. All of their AFC foes were their own division rivals.

NFL Draft

Personnel

Staff

Roster

Schedule

Standings

References

External links
Denver Broncos – 1982 media guide
1982 Denver Broncos at Pro-Football-Reference.com

Denver Broncos
Denver Broncos seasons
Denver Bronco